Pasquale Turi (born 18 May 1993) is an Italian footballer who plays as a defender.

Career
Born in Bari, Apulia, Turi started his professional career at Taranto after leaving the reserve of A.S. Bari during 2010–11 season. Turi was a midfielder or forward for Bari youth teams. He was the member of the reserve of Taranto from circa January 2011 until January 2012. Primary a midfielder, he also played for the reserve as forward, scoring a hat-trick against the reserve of Campobasso. In January 2012, 6 months before the bankruptcy of Taranto, he was loaned to Giacomense. In the same month his also received call-up to represent the Lega Pro 1st Div. Group A in the quadrangular tournament, but as a defender. Eventually Turi was the champion. In April 2012 he received call-up from Lega Pro under-20 representative team to Dubai for a youth tournament against youth team of other football clubs, which Italy Lega Pro was the champion. In June 2012, Turi was among the team that winning San Marino under-21.

In the next season Turi left for Pavia.

On 17 July 2013 he received a call-up to pre-season camp of newly relegated Serie B team A.C. Siena. On 13 August 2013 Turi left for Chieti in temporary deal.

After the bankruptcy of Siena, Turi was signed by Forlì.

On 2 November 2018, Turi joined Matera. In February 2019, Matera was excluded from the Italian Serie C, and in the beginning of March 2019 it was announced, that Turi had left the club and was free to join another club.

References

External links
 AIC profile (data by football.it)  
 

Italian footballers
S.S.C. Bari players
Taranto F.C. 1927 players
A.C. Giacomense players
F.C. Pavia players
A.C.N. Siena 1904 players
S.S. Fidelis Andria 1928 players
Matera Calcio players
Serie C players
Association football defenders
Footballers from Bari
1993 births
Living people
Virtus Francavilla Calcio players